Formal relations between Albania and Spain were established in 1986. Albania has an embassy in Madrid, and Spain has an embassy in Tirana.

The countries are both members of the North Atlantic Treaty Organization and the Organization for Security and Co-operation in Europe. As a European Union (EU) member, Spain supports Albania in its euro-integration path.

History 

The diplomat Juan Pedro Aladro Kastriota was the pretender of the throne of Albania. Kastriota claimed descent from the medieval nobel Kastrioti family through his paternal grandmother.

During the Spanish Civil War, many Albanians took part on this event as members of the International Brigades, such as Asim Vokshi who was a staff officer of the Garibaldi Battalion, scholar and anti-fascist activist Skënder Luarasi, and novelist Petro Marko, who was a volunteer of the republican force of the event. His best-known novel is titled Hasta La Vista.

For years, the Spanish government accused Albania of providing support to the FRAP.  In 1977, first informal diplomatic contacts between both parties were channeled. Formal diplomatic relations between both countries were established in September 1986.

See also 
 Foreign relations of Albania
 Foreign relations of Spain
 Accession of Albania to the European Union

External links 
 Albanian Embassy in Madrid
 Spanish Embassy in Tirana

References 

 

 
Spain
Bilateral relations of Spain